Julio González (born 16 November 1943) is a Salvadoran sports shooter. He competed in the mixed trap event at the 1984 Summer Olympics.

References

1943 births
Living people
Salvadoran male sport shooters
Olympic shooters of El Salvador
Shooters at the 1984 Summer Olympics
Place of birth missing (living people)